Ithycythara hyperlepta is a species of sea snail, a marine gastropod mollusk in the family Mangeliidae.

Description
The length of the shell varies between 6 mm and 10 mm.

Distribution
This marine species occurs from Colombia to Eastern Brazil.

References

 Haas, Fritz. Mollusks from Ilha Grande, Rio de Janeiro, Brazil. Fritz Haas,... Chicago natural history museum, 1953.

External links
 
  Tucker, J.K. 2004 Catalog of recent and fossil turrids (Mollusca: Gastropoda). Zootaxa 682:1–1295.
 Biolib;cz: image of Ithycythara hyperlepta

hyperlepta
Gastropods described in 1953